Baird House may refer to:

Baird House (Opa-Locka, Florida), listed on the National Register of Historic Places in Florida
Theodore Baird Residence, Amherst, Massachusetts, designed by Frank Lloyd Wright and also known as Baird House (and listed as Baird House on National Register of Historic Places)